SS18 LRT station is a  Light Rapid Transit station connects the SS14 and SS18 neighborhoods in Subang Jaya, Selangor. The station is located at the end of Jalan Jengka.

It is operated under the Kelana Jaya LRT system network as found in the station signage. Like most other LRT stations operating in Klang Valley, this station is elevated.

Shuttle buses

External links 
SS18 LRT station

Kelana Jaya Line
Railway stations opened in 2016